The 2022 Curling Stadium Alberta Curling Series Major was held from September 9 to 18 at the Leduc Recreation Centre in Leduc, Alberta. The men's event ran from September 9 to 12 and the women's event went from September 15 to 18. It was the major men's and women's event held as part of the Alberta Curling Series for the 2022–23 curling season. The total purse for the event was $27,000 on the men's side and $15,750 on the women's side.

The event was sponsored by Curling Stadium, a streaming service provided by CurlingZone. All of the games were streamed on CurlingZone and the Alberta Curling Series' YouTube page.

Men

Teams
The teams are listed as follows:

Knockout brackets

Source:

A event

B event

C event

Knockout results 
All draw times are listed in Mountain Time (UTC−06:00).

Draw 1
Friday, September 9, 9:30 am

Draw 2
Friday, September 9, 1:00 pm

Draw 3
Friday, September 9, 4:30 pm

Draw 4
Friday, September 9, 8:00 pm

Draw 5
Saturday, September 10, 9:30 am

Draw 6
Saturday, September 10, 1:00 pm

Draw 7
Saturday, September 10, 4:30 pm

Draw 8
Saturday, September 10, 8:00 pm

Draw 9
Sunday, September 11, 10:00 am

Draw 10
Sunday, September 11, 2:00 pm

Playoffs

Source:

Quarterfinals
Sunday, September 11, 7:00 pm

Semifinals
Monday, September 12, 10:00 am

Final
Monday, September 12, 1:30 pm

Women

Teams
The teams are listed as follows:

Knockout brackets

Source:

A event

B event

C event

Knockout results 
All draw times are listed in Mountain Time (UTC−06:00).

Draw 1
Thursday, September 15, 7:00 pm

Draw 2
Friday, September 16, 10:00 am

Draw 3
Friday, September 16, 1:00 pm

Draw 4
Friday, September 16, 4:00 pm

Draw 5
Friday, September 16, 7:00 pm

Draw 6
Saturday, September 17, 10:00 am

Draw 7
Saturday, September 17, 1:00 pm

Draw 8
Saturday, September 17, 7:00 pm

Playoffs

Source:

Quarterfinals
Sunday, September 18, 9:00 am

Semifinals
Sunday, September 18, 12:00 pm

Final
Sunday, September 18, 3:00 pm

Notes

References

External links
Official Website
Men's Event
Women's Event

2022 in Canadian curling
2022 in curling
Curling in Alberta
September 2022 sports events in Canada
2022 in Alberta
Leduc, Alberta